Ziria may refer to:

an alternative name for Mount Kyllini, southern Greece
Ziria, Achaea, a village in Achaea, southern Greece
Tengai Makyō: Ziria, a video game